KDY could refer to:

 Kirkcaldy railway station, Scotland, with National Rail station code KDY
 Kildorrery, Ireland, commonly abbreviated as KDY locally.
 Krio Descendants Union
 Kuat Drive Yards, a company in the fictional Star Wars universe that manufactures Star Destroyers
 Kongelig Dansk Yachtklub, a yacht club in Denmark